William Moylon (31 December 1915 – 21 November 2014) was a soldier of the British Army who survived over three years in Japanese prisoner of war camps during the Second World War where he worked on the Burma Railway and was forced to eat lizards to survive. He later became a Chelsea Pensioner and was involved in attempts at reconciliation with the Japanese.

References

External links
Bill Moylon reciting The Good Indians Prayer.

1915 births
2014 deaths
Royal Army Ordnance Corps soldiers
British World War II prisoners of war
British Army personnel of World War II
Burma Railway prisoners
Chelsea Pensioners